The Daade (also called the Daadenbach) is the largest tributary of the River Heller, in the district of Altenkirchen in the northeast of the German state of Rhineland-Palatinate. It flows through the northeastern part of the Westerwald.

The Daade Valley Railway runs along the Daade from Daaden via Alsdorf to Betzdorf, on the main line from Cologne to Siegen.

Villages 
The villages on the Daade are:

 Emmerzhausen
 Daaden (largest settlement on the Daade) 
 Biersdorf (part of Daaden)
 Niederdreisbach
 Schutzbach
 Alsdorf

Tributaries 
The tributaries of the Daade (in downstream order) are the:

 Derscherbach (left, 3.9 km, 9.3 km²) (GKZ 272282)
 Birenbach (right, 2.0 km, 2.3 km²) (GKZ 2722832)
 Friedewalderbach (left, 4.9 km, 8.1 km²) (GKZ 272284)
 Dreisbach (left, 5.6 km, 8.4 km²) (GKZ 272286)
 Schutzbach (left, 3.1 km, 3.6 km²) (GKZ 272288)

All left tributaries have their sources on the Neunkhausen-Weitefeld Plateau, but cut deep valleys in the Heller Upland.

See also 
List of rivers of Rhineland-Palatinate

References

External links 
 Touristik-Information: Grubenwanderweg (PDF; 232 kB) „Vom Erz zum Eisen im Tal der Daade und Heller“
 

Rivers of the Westerwald
Rivers of Rhineland-Palatinate
Altenkirchen (district)
Rivers of Germany